Khilkhet Thana is a thana (sub-district) of Dhaka, Bangladesh. It was created in 2005.

Geography
It is bounded on the east by the Turag River (across which lies Rupganj Upazila of Narayanganj District). It borders Dhakshinkhan and Uttar Khan thanas to the north, Badda Thana to the south, Cantonment Thana to the west, and Bimanbandar Thana to the northwest. Nearest residential area of Khilkhet thana building is Nikunja-1 and Nikunja-2.

History
Administration of Khilkhet Thana was established on 27 June in 2005  that consists of south parts of Badda thana. Before, this area was under the administration of Badda thana.

Demographics
According to the 2011 Bangladesh census, Khilkhet Thana had 31,141 households and a population of 130,053, all of whom lived in urban areas. 8.6% of the population was under the age of 5. The literacy rate (age 7 and over) was 73.8%, compared to the national average of 51.8%.

Administration
Khilkhet Thana consists of part of Dhaka North City Corporation Ward No. 17, part of Dakshinkhan Union, and [Dumni Union].

Education

There are two colleges in this thana. They are: Amirjan College located at Dumni, and Kurmitola High School and College, located at Khilkhet.

Kurmitola High School and College, popularly known as Khilkhet High School is the epicenter of modern education in these entire area which was established in 1948, while Amirjan College was established in 2012.

There are a number of schools in this thana. According to Dhaka Education Board institute website this thana has six high schools: Amirjan High School, Jan-E-Alam Sarker High School, Barua Alauddin Dewan High School, Dumni High School,Talna Ruhul Amin Khan High Schoo And Jahid ikbal High School.

Religious Institutions
According to the information of Banglapedia, there are 67 mosques and 3 temples.  Notable ones are: Dumni Nama Para Jame Masjid, Dumni Bazar Jame Masjid, Dumni Kali Mondir, Barua Shah Jame Masjid, Nikunja-2 central Jame Masjid.

See also
 Upazilas of Bangladesh
 Districts of Bangladesh
 Divisions of Bangladesh

References

Thanas of Dhaka
Areas under Dhaka-18 constituency